The Presentation of Benefices Act 1688 (1 Will & Mary c 26) was an Act of the Parliament of England.

The whole Act was repealed by section 41(2) of, and Schedule 5 to, the Patronage (Benefices) Measure 1986.

References
Halsbury's Statutes,

Acts of the Parliament of England
1688 in law
1688 in England